The short gastric veins, four or five in number, drain the fundus and left part of the greater curvature of the stomach, and pass between the two layers of the gastrolienal ligament to end in the splenic vein or in one of its large tributaries.

References

Veins of the torso